Pan American Baseball Stadium is a 3,781 seat stadium in Lagos de Moreno, Mexico.  It was built in 2010 to host the baseball competition at the 2011 Pan American Games.

Not to be confused with Estadio Panamericano de Béisbol, the stadium in Zapopan that was used for the athletics competitions and later converted for baseball use.

References

Sports venues completed in 2010
Baseball venues in Mexico
Venues of the 2011 Pan American Games
Sports venues in Jalisco